Achates may refer to:
Achates (Greek mythology)
Achates, name of two ships
Achates (river), the Sicilian river known in antiquity as the Achates
5144 Achates, an asteroid
Agate, the gemstone called achates by Theophrastus and Pliny the Elder
Leonardus Achates, the fifteenth century composer from Basel
, the series of British Royal Navy ships named for after this character
Achates Power, an American developer of engines